The Queen of the Caribbean is a 1901 adventure novel written by Italian novelist Emilio Salgari.  Set in the Caribbean during the Golden Age of Piracy, the novel follows the exploits of Emilio Roccanera, Lord of Ventimiglia as he continues his attempts to avenge his brothers, slain by the Duke Van Guld, as narrated in the first book of the series, The Black Corsair. This novel focuses on the struggles between the  Black Corsair's quest for vengeance and his guilt for having abandoned Honorata, his love interest and daughter of his enemy.

Plot summary 
Four years have passed since the battle of Gibraltar. The Black Corsair has tracked Duke Van Guld down to Veracruz at last, and has formed an alliance with Nicholas van Hoorn, Michel de Grammont and Laurens de Graaf, three of the most formidable pirates in the Gulf, to finally bring his foe to justice. After Van Guld explodes his ship as a final resource, the Black Corsair and some of his men manage to escape and are lost in the jungles, at which point they're captured by the native Caribs. Fortunately for them, Honorata had shipwrecked on the coast before and was believed by the natives to be a sea deity and then followed as their queen. After they're freed by her, the Corsair decides to stop his piracy and return with Honorata to Italy.

The Series
The quest for vengeance stretches over the course of several novels: The Black Corsair (Il corsaro nero),The Queen of the Caribbean (La regina dei Caraibi), Yolanda, The Black Corsair's Daughter (Jolanda, la figlia del Corsaro Nero), and The Son of the Red Corsair (Il figlio del corsaro rosso).

Film versions 
There have been several film versions of the novels. In the 1920s, director Vitale Di Stefano first brought the Corsair trilogy to the screen with a series of silent films. In 1937, Amleto Palermi directed the first remake of Il corsaro nero and Italian fencing champion Ciro Verratti was cast to play the Black Corsair.  In 1944, Mexican director Chano Urueta filmed El corsario negro, the first Spanish language adaptation. In 1976, Kabir Bedi and Carole André were reunited to portray The Black Corsair and Honorata in another Sergio Sollima adaptation of a Salgari classic, The Black Corsair. Urueta's and Sollima's films are available on DVD. In 1999 Mondo TV (Italy) created a 26-episode animated TV series "The Black Corsair".

Trivia 
In the late 19th century Emilio Salgari was Italy's foremost writer of adventure novels. He was knighted in 1897 in recognition for his work. The Black Corsair, the Chevalier Emilio, is named after himself. He also pays tribute to the House of Savoy, Italy's Royal family to show his gratitude. Yolanda, the Black Corsair's daughter is named after Princess Yolanda of Savoy.

Salgari used Geschichte der Filibustier. The History of the Pirates, Free-Booters, or Buccaneers of America. by Johann Wilhelm von Archenholz as one of his main references. The attack on Vera Cruz is based on true events as are the biographies of the pirates that appear in the novel.

See also

Novels in the Sandokan series:
 The Mystery of the Black Jungle
 The Tigers of Mompracem
 The Pirates of Malaysia
 The Two Tigers
 The King of the Sea
 Quest for a Throne

Novels in The Black Corsair series:
 The Black Corsair
 The Queen of the Caribbean
 Yolanda, the Black Corsair's Daughter
 Son of the Red Corsair

Novels in Captain Tempesta series

 Captain Tempesta
 The Lion of Damascus

External links

  
 Read the first chapter.
 Read a review at Readers' Favorite.
 Tragic Heroes: A Case for The Black Corsair.
 Read a review at Pirates and Privateers.
 Read a review at Vintage Pop Fictions.
 Read a review at Kirkus Reviews.
 Read Decadence for Kids: Il Corsaro Nero in Context by Ann Lawson Lucas
 Italy’s enduring love affair with Emilio Salgari, The Economist, June 2017

1901 novels
Novels by Emilio Salgari
Italian novels adapted into films